Pseudohalonectria is a genus of fungi in the family Magnaporthaceae.

Species
Pseudohalonectria adversaria
Pseudohalonectria aomoriensis
Pseudohalonectria eubenangeensis
Pseudohalonectria falcata
Pseudohalonectria fuxianii
Pseudohalonectria halophila
Pseudohalonectria lignicola
Pseudohalonectria longirostrum
Pseudohalonectria lutea
Pseudohalonectria miscanthicola
Pseudohalonectria palmicola
Pseudohalonectria phialidica
Pseudohalonectria suthepensis
Pseudohalonectria tayloriae

References

External links 

Sordariomycetes genera
Magnaporthales